Viviparus acerosus is a species of freshwater snail with an operculum, an aquatic gastropod mollusk in the family Viviparidae, the river snails.

Distribution
The distribution of this species is Danubian.

It is found in Austria, Bulgaria, Croatia, Czech Republic (in Moravia only), Slovakia, Germany, Hungary and Romania.

Its non-indigenous distribution includes the Netherlands since 2007.

References

Viviparidae
Taxonomy articles created by Polbot
Gastropods described in 1862